Dante Bruno Fascell (March 9, 1917 – November 28, 1998)  was an American politician who represented Florida as a member of the United States House of Representatives from 1955 to 1993. He served as chairman of the House Foreign Affairs Committee for nine years.

Early life and education
Dante Fascell was born in Bridgehampton, New York. In 1925, his family moved to Florida. In 1938, he graduated from the University of Miami School of Law. Fascell was a brother of Phi Mu Alpha Sinfonia fraternity and the Kappa Sigma fraternity. While a University of Miami law school student, Fascell was inducted into its Iron Arrow Honor Society, the University of Miami's highest honor. 
 
Fascell joined the Florida National Guard in 1941 and was commissioned as a second lieutenant in 1942, serving in the African, Sicilian, and Italian Campaigns during World War II, eventually rising to the rank of captain.

Political career
Fascell was elected to the Florida House of Representatives in 1950. In 1954 he was elected to the U.S. House of Representatives as a Democrat in a district representing Dade County, Florida. 

Fascell was the sole Democrat representative from the state of Florida (1 of 7) to not sign the 1956 Southern Manifesto. Fascell would later go on to vote in favor of the Civil Rights Acts of 1960 and 1968, in addition to the 24th Amendment to the U.S. Constitution and the Voting Rights Act of 1965, but not the Civil Rights Acts of 1957 and 1964.

Fascell began as a supporter of the Vietnam War, but he soon spoke out against the war. Fascell cosponsored the War Powers Act of 1973 and he won aid for Cuban-Americans who had settled in his district. He served as the chairman of the House Committee on Foreign Affairs from 1984 to 1993. He worked to repeal the Clark Amendment, allowing the U.S. government to send aid to UNITA rebels in Angola, as a partner in the Black, Manafort, Stone and Kelly lobbying firm.

Fascell worked to champion the creation of Biscayne National Park, south of Miami.  It was signed into law by President Lyndon B. Johnson in 1968.  The visitor center in the park is named after Representative Fascell.  Similarly, a public park located in South Miami is named for him.  The Dante B. Fascell North-South Center Act of 1991 established the prestigious think-tank at the University of Miami.

Fascell retired from the House after his 19th term ended in 1993. When President Bill Clinton took office he proposed to nominate Fascell as the United States Ambassador to Italy, however Fascell declined for family reasons as he had developed colorectal cancer. On October 29, 1998, Fascell was presented with the Presidential Medal of Freedom by President Clinton. He died the following month from colorectal cancer, at the age of 81.

Publications

References

Further reading
  
  
  
  
  
  
 Congressional Timeline: 73rd Congress (March 9, 1933) - 111th Congress (March 10, 2009)
 For each Congress beginning with the 73rd (1933–35), this timeline features session dates, partisan composition, the presidential administration, a list of congressional leaders, and notable legislation passed. This first version only addresses legislative output, not non-legislative events such as the impeachment of President Clinton or internal congressional processes or congressional politics.
 Information about related materials is available at http://www.congressionaltimeline.org/

External links

 The Dante B. Fascell Congressional Papers, 1955-1993 is/are available at the Special Collections Division, University of Miami Libraries. 
 The Emergency Committee for Reappraisal of United States Overseas Programs and Policies 
 The Georgetown University
 

|-

|-

|-

|-

|-

|-

1917 births
1998 deaths
20th-century American politicians
United States Army personnel of World War II
American people of Italian descent
Deaths from cancer in Florida
Deaths from colorectal cancer
Democratic Party members of the United States House of Representatives from Florida
Democratic Party members of the Florida House of Representatives
People from Bridgehampton, New York
Politicians from Miami
Presidential Medal of Freedom recipients
University of Miami School of Law alumni
United States Army officers
Florida National Guard personnel